Stage Door Theater may refer to:

a former name for the building now housing the nightclub Ruby Skye
a theatre in the North Carolina Blumenthal Performing Arts Center